9115 Battisti, provisional designation , is a stony Vestian asteroid from the inner regions of the asteroid belt, approximately 5.5 kilometers in diameter. It was discovered on 27 February 1997, by Italian astronomers Piero Sicoli and Francesco Manca at Sormano Astronomical Observatory in northern Italy. The asteroid was named for Italian singer-songwriter Lucio Battisti.

Orbit and classification 

Battisti is a member of the Vestian family. It orbits the Sun in the inner main-belt at a distance of 2.2–2.6 AU once every 3 years and 9 months (1,354 days). Its orbit has an eccentricity of 0.09 and an inclination of 5° with respect to the ecliptic.

Physical characteristics

Rotation period 

In November 2010, a fragmentary rotational lightcurve of Battisti was obtained from photometric observations at the Palomar Transient Factory in California. It gave a rotation period of  hours with a low brightness variation of 0.07 magnitude, typically indicating that the asteroid has a nearly spheroidal shape.

Diameter and albedo 

According to the survey carried out by NASA's Wide-field Infrared Survey Explorer with its subsequent NEOWISE mission, Battisti measures 5.7 kilometers in diameter and its surface has an albedo of 0.195, while the Collaborative Asteroid Lightcurve Link assumes a standard albedo of 0.20 for stony asteroids and calculates a diameter of 5.1 kilometers, based on an absolute magnitude of 13.82.

Naming 

This minor planet was named in memory of Italian singer-songwriter Lucio Battisti (1943–1998). In the 1970s, Battisti lived in a small village near Sormano, location of the discovering observatory. The official naming citation was published by the Minor Planet Center on 8 December 1998, three months after his death.

References

External links 
 Asteroid Lightcurve Database (LCDB), query form (info )
 Dictionary of Minor Planet Names, Google books
 Asteroids and comets rotation curves, CdR – Observatoire de Genève, Raoul Behrend
 Discovery Circumstances: Numbered Minor Planets (5001)-(10000) – Minor Planet Center
 
 

009115
Discoveries by Piero Sicoli
Discoveries by Francesco Manca
Named minor planets
19970227